General Hendrik Balzazar Klopper (also Balthazar),  was a South African military commander. He commanded the 3rd Infantry Brigade and was later promoted to command the 2nd Infantry Division during the Western Desert Campaign of the Second World War.  He is best known for surrendering the Division to Rommel after the failed defence of the Tobruk harbour in June 1942. After the war, he became Army Chief of Staff from 1950 to 1953, and Commandant General of the Union Defence Force from 1956 until his retirement in 1958.

Military career
Klopper joined the South African Army in 1924.

World War II
During the Second World War, he commanded the 3rd Infantry Brigade in the North African Campaign, for which he was awarded the Distinguished Service Order. He then briefly commanded 2nd Infantry Division. As fortress commander, Klopper was forced to surrender Tobruk and its garrison to Axis forces on 21 June 1942. He escaped from captivity in 1943 and was exonerated by a 1942 Court of Inquiry into the Tobruk disaster.

South African Army College
Klopper was Officer Commanding the South African Army College from 1944 to 1945, before being appointed in command of Northern Command in 1945.

Post-war
Klopper served as Army Chief of Staff from 1951 to 1953, as Inspector-General from 1953 to 1956, and as Commandant General of the Union Defence Force from 1956 to 1958.

References

External links
Generals of World War II

|-

|-

|-

|-

1903 births
1978 deaths
Afrikaner people
Chiefs of the South African Army
Companions of the Distinguished Service Order
South African military personnel of World War II
South African prisoners of war
World War II prisoners of war held by Germany